I'm Bout It is the soundtrack to the film of the same name. It was released on May 20, 1997, through EMI, Priority Records and Master P's No Limit Records and featured production from Beats By the Pound, Brotha Lynch Hung, E-A-Ski and the Fast One.

Commercial and chart performance
The soundtrack was a success, peaking at number 4 on the Billboard 200 chart, and number 1 on the Top R&B/Hip-Hop Albums, becoming No Limit's first number-one album, with first-week sales of 300,000 units. In addition, the single "If I Could Change" rose to number 40 on the Billboard Hot 100, number 27 on the Hot R&B/Hip-Hop Singles & Tracks, and number 5 on the Hot Rap Singles; another single "Pushin' Inside You" made it to number 70 on the Billboard Hot 100. By January 22, 1998.

Track listing

Charts

Weekly charts

Year-end charts

Certifications

See also
List of number-one R&B albums of 1997 (U.S.)

References

Hip hop soundtracks
1997 soundtrack albums
No Limit Records soundtracks
Priority Records soundtracks
Gangsta rap soundtracks